Linda Tuumuliga Vagana  (born 23 July 1971 in Auckland, New Zealand) is an international netball coach and former representative player from New Zealand. Vagana played as a circle defender, and was a member of the New Zealand national netball team, the Silver Ferns, from 1993 (joining the squad at the end of 1992) up until 2002, earning 61 caps. She was appointed a Member of the New Zealand Order of Merit in the 2003 Queen's Birthday Honours, for services to netball. Domestically, she played for the Northern Force in the National Bank Cup from 1998 to 2005.

Vagana currently coaches the Samoa national netball team, and is the General Manager of Duffy Books in Homes. She is the cousin of rugby league players Nigel Vagana and Joe Vagana.

References

New Zealand netball coaches
New Zealand netball players
New Zealand international netball players
Commonwealth Games silver medallists for New Zealand
Netball players at the 1998 Commonwealth Games
New Zealand sportspeople of Samoan descent
Members of the New Zealand Order of Merit
Netball players from Auckland
1971 births
Living people
People educated at Massey High School
Commonwealth Games medallists in netball
Netball players at the 1993 World Games
1999 World Netball Championships players
Northern Force players
2003 World Netball Championships players
Samoan netball players
Northern Mystics coaches
Medallists at the 1998 Commonwealth Games